Annette av Paul  (born February 11, 1944) is a Swedish-Canadian ballet dancer who had a 30-year dance career performing, teaching,
and directing companies across Canada. Av Paul was born in Rönninge, Sweden, about 30 kilometres outside Stockholm on February 11, 1944. Her mother was a dance and piano teacher and her father an artist and writer. She studied at the Royal Swedish Ballet School and in 1962, at the age of 17, was apprenticed to the company, becoming principal dancer in 1966.

It was there that she met her husband, Canadian dancer/choreographer Brian Macdonald, who was director of the Royal Swedish Ballet at the time. They moved to Canada in 1973 and Macdonald became artistic director of Les Grands Ballets Canadiens from 1974-1977, and resident choreographer there from 1977-1990. She danced with Les Grands for 14 years, retiring in 1984.

Following retirement Av Paul was a guest performer and coach at many Canadian and international dance companies, including the National Ballet of Canada, the Royal Winnipeg Ballet, Les Ballets Jazz de Montreal, Royal Swedish Ballet, the Gothenburg Ballet Company and Canada's National Ballet School. She was founding artistic director of Ballet BC from 1985-1988.

Av Paul became associate program head of the Banff Centre for the Arts in Alberta, where she taught in the professional and dance training programs and is currently a coach with the Birmingham Conservatory at the Stratford Festival.

References

1944 births
Living people
Swedish ballerinas
Canadian ballerinas
Swedish female dancers
Canadian female dancers
Officers of the Order of Canada
People from Stockholm
Swedish emigrants to Canada